The 85th Academy Awards ceremony, presented by the Academy of Motion Picture Arts and Sciences (AMPAS), honored the best films of 2012 and took place on February 24, 2013, at the Dolby Theatre in Hollywood, Los Angeles beginning at 5:30 p.m. PST / 8:30 p.m. EST. The ceremony was the first in the Academy's 85-year history to adopt the phrase "The Oscars" as the ceremony's official name during the broadcast and marketing. During the ceremony, the Academy of Motion Picture Arts and Sciences presented Academy Awards (commonly referred to as Oscars) in 24 categories. The ceremony was televised in the United States by ABC, and produced by Craig Zadan and Neil Meron and directed by Don Mischer. Actor Seth MacFarlane hosted the show for the first time.

In related events, the Academy held its 4th annual Governors Awards ceremony at the Grand Ballroom of the Hollywood and Highland Center on December 1, 2012. On February 9, 2013, in a ceremony at The Beverly Hills Hotel in Beverly Hills, California, the Academy Awards for Technical Achievement were presented by hosts Chris Pine and Zoe Saldana.

Argo won three awards, including Best Picture, the first film to win an Academy Award for Best Picture without its director nominated since Driving Miss Daisy. Other winners included Life of Pi with four awards, Les Misérables with three, Django Unchained, Lincoln, and Skyfall with two, and Amour, Anna Karenina, Brave, Curfew, Inocente, Paperman, Searching for Sugar Man, Silver Linings Playbook and Zero Dark Thirty with one. The telecast garnered more than 40 million viewers in the United States.

Winners and nominees 

The nominees for the 85th Academy Awards were announced on January 10, 2013, at 5:38 a.m. PST (13:38 UTC) at the Samuel Goldwyn Theater in Beverly Hills, California, by Seth MacFarlane, host of the ceremony, and actress Emma Stone. Lincoln received the most nominations with twelve total, and Life of Pi came in second with eleven.

The winners were announced during the awards ceremony on February 24, 2013. Argo was the fourth film to win Best Picture without a directing nomination, following 1927's Wings, 1932's Grand Hotel, and 1989's Driving Miss Daisy. As co-producer of Argo, George Clooney became the third individual to win Oscars for both acting and producing. By virtue of his nomination for Best Original Song in Ted, host Seth MacFarlane became the first person since James Franco, who was a co-host and a Best Actor nominee during the 83rd ceremony in 2011, to host the ceremony while receiving a nomination in the same year. Silver Linings Playbook was the fourteenth film to earn nominations in all four acting categories, and the first since Reds in 1981. At age 22, Best Actress winner Jennifer Lawrence became the second-youngest winner in that category. With his third win for Best Lead Actor, Daniel Day-Lewis became the first three-time winner in that category. He also was the sixth performer to win at least three acting Oscars. Amour was the fourth film nominated simultaneously for Best Picture and Best Foreign Language Film in the same year. At age nine, Quvenzhané Wallis became the youngest nominee for Best Actress and the youngest female acting nominee overall. Meanwhile, Emmanuelle Riva (aged 85) was the oldest nominee for Best Actress. This marked the first time in Oscar history that all five nominees in an acting category (Best Supporting Actor) were all previous winners. Skyfall and Zero Dark Thirtys joint win in the Best Sound Editing category was the sixth occurrence of a tie in Oscar history.

Awards 

Winners are listed first, highlighted in boldface, and indicated with a double dagger.

Honorary Academy Awards
The Academy held its 4th Annual Governors Awards ceremony on December 1, 2012, during which the following awards were presented.

Academy Honorary Award
Hal Needham  An innovator, mentor, and master technician who elevated his craft to an art and made the impossible look easy.
D. A. Pennebaker  Who redefined the language of film and taught a generation of filmmakers to look to reality for inspiration.
George Stevens Jr.  A tireless champion of the arts in America and especially that most American of arts: the Hollywood film.

Jean Hersholt Humanitarian Award
Jeffrey Katzenberg  who has led our community in enlightened philanthropy by his extraordinary example.

Films with multiple nominations and awards

The following 15 films received multiple nominations:

The following six films received multiple awards:

Presenters and performers 

The following individuals, listed in order of appearance, presented awards or performed musical numbers.

Presenters

Performers

Ceremony information 

Due to declining interest and viewership in recent ceremonies, the Academy hired a new production team in an attempt to improve ratings and revive interest in the ceremony. Reports surfaced that Academy then-president Tom Sherak approached television producer Lorne Michaels for producing duties with actor and comedian Jimmy Fallon as host. However, the telecast's broadcaster ABC objected to these selections, and both men declined afterward. With newly elected Academy president Hawk Koch assuming leadership duties, the Academy hired Neil Meron and Craig Zadan in August 2012 to produce the ceremony. Two months later, the Academy announced that actor, director, animator, singer, and comedian Seth MacFarlane would host the telecast. MacFarlane expressed that it was truly an honor and a thrill to be asked to host Academy Awards commenting, "It's truly an overwhelming privilege to be asked to host the Oscars. My thoughts upon hearing the news were, one, I will do my utmost to live up to the high standards set forth by my predecessors; and two, I hope they don't find out I hosted the Charlie Sheen Roast." In an unusual break from previous years, producers Meron and Zadan announced that the on-air telecast of the ceremony would be simply referred to as "The Oscars" instead of "The 85th Annual Academy Awards".

As evident by the numerous musical numbers featured throughout the telecast, the ceremony was billed as a salute to music and the movies. In keeping with the theme of the evening, numerous film scores from various motion pictures were played intermittently throughout the ceremony; most notable was John Williams' theme music from Jaws, which was used to goad winners off the stage if their acceptance speeches were overly long. In a departure from having the orchestra perform in the same theatre, composer Williams Ross conducted the orchestra from a studio inside the Capitol Records Building a mile away.

Several other people were involved with the telecast and its promotion. Tony Award-winning art director Derek McLane designed a new set and stage design for the ceremony. Rob Ashford served as choreographer for several musical numbers during the event. Comedians Ben Gleib and Annie Greenup served as correspondents and hosts of "Oscar Road Trip", a nationwide bus tour promoting the ceremony in eleven major cities across the United States. Six young film students from colleges across the country, who were selected from a contest conducted by AMPAS and MtvU, were recruited to appear onstage to deliver Oscar statuettes to the presenters during the gala.

Introduction of electronic voting system
In January 2012, AMPAS announced that it would create electronic voting system starting with the 2013 ceremony as another method for members to select the nominees and winners during the process. According to AMPAS Chief Operating Officer Ric Robertson, the implementation of the digital ballot was designed to increase participation among members in the voting process and to provide an alternative method of voting in case of emergency. Despite several Academy officials denying such reasons, some industry insiders speculated that the introduction of electronic voting was another move toward moving future awards galas to January. The deadline to submit nomination ballots was originally scheduled for January 3, but technological errors and glitches prompted the Academy to move the deadline one day later.

Box office performance of nominated films
None of the nine Best Picture nominees were among the top ten releases in box office during the nominations. However, four of those films had already earned $100 million in American and Canadian ticket sales. At the time of the announcement of nominations on January 10, Lincoln was the highest-grossing film among the Best Picture nominees with $144 million in domestic box office receipts. The other three films to earn $100 million prior to nominations were Django Unchained with $112 million, Argo with $110 million, and Les Misérables with $103 million. Among the five remaining Best Picture nominees, Life of Pi was the next highest-grossing film with $91.8 million followed by Silver Linings Playbook ($35.7 million), Beasts of the Southern Wild ($11.2 million), Zero Dark Thirty ($4.4 million), and finally Amour ($311,247). The combined gross of the nine Best Picture nominees when the Oscars were announced was $620 million with an average gross of $68.9 million per film.

Of the top 50 grossing movies of the year, 61 nominations went to 15 films on the list. Only Brave (8th), Wreck-It Ralph (13th), Lincoln (17th), Django Unchained (23rd), Argo (26th), Les Misérables (27th), Flight (30th), and Life of Pi (31st) were nominated for Best Picture, Best Animated Feature, or any of the directing, acting, or screenwriting awards. The other top 50 box office hits that earned nominations were Marvel's The Avengers (1st), Skyfall (4th), The Hobbit: An Unexpected Journey (6th), Ted (13th), Snow White and the Huntsman (15th), Prometheus (20th), and Mirror Mirror (44th).

"We Saw Your Boobs" controversy 
During the opening monologue, MacFarlane is told by James T. Kirk (William Shatner) (Captain Kirk set in the next day) about how he was going to ruin the telecast, Captain Kirk then shows him a music video where MacFarlane sings We Saw Your Boobs. Its lyrics lists out movies that featured scenes of actresses' disrobing.

The song has mixed reviews. On the positive side, The Guardian reported, "MacFarlane was employed partly to puncture the event's pomposity, which he did by lightheartedly pointing out that some of the world's most self-important people regularly get their kit off for money". SheKnows wonders if the live reaction of some of the actresses were indeed acting as the "pre-recorded spoof apparently looked real enough for social media to worry about it". On the negative side, actress Jane Fonda stated, "if they want to stoop to that, why not list all the penises we’ve seen? Better yet, remember that this is a telecast seen around the world watched by families with their children and to many this is neither appropriate or funny." California assemblywoman Bonnie Lowenthal and state senator Hannah-Beth Jackson expressed their disappointment at MacFarlane, ABC, and AMPAS in a press release reading, "there was a disturbing theme about violence against women being acceptable and funny. From topical jabs about domestic violence to singing about 'boobs' during a film's rape scene, Seth MacFarlane crossed the line from humor to misogyny." Amy Davidson of The New Yorker interpreted the song as hostile to women.

In a press release statement, the Academy defended MacFarlane for expressing his artistic freedom, "If the Oscars are about anything, they're about creative freedom. We think the show's producers Craig Zadan and Neil Meron, and host Seth MacFarlane did a great job and we hope our worldwide audience found the show entertaining."

Critical reviews 
The show received a mixed reception from media publications. Some media outlets were more critical of the show. Columnist Owen Gleiberman of Entertainment Weekly commented "By calling constant attention to the naughty factor", MacFarlane created "an echo chamber of outrage, working a little too hard to top himself with faux-scandalous gags about race, Jews in Hollywood, and the killing of Abraham Lincoln." The Washington Post television critic Hank Stuever bemoaned, "There was nothing notably terrible about the show, and nothing particularly enthralling." Regarding MacFarlane's performance as host, Stuever noted, "What you got was a combination of sicko and retro, an Oscar show hosted by someone who waited until Oscar night to discover that he's only so-so at stand-up comedy." Television editor Alan Sepinwall of HitFix lamented that the ceremony made for a "frequently messy, but occasionally surprising and/or entertaining evening." He added that MacFarlane "had some funny moments here and there, but he missed way more than he hit, and Frat Boy Seth quickly assumed dominance as the evening went along."

Other media outlets received the broadcast and more positively. Tim Goodman of The Hollywood Reporter praised MacFarlane's performance saying that he did "impressively better than one would have wagered." He also noted that he added "plenty of niceties with a little bit of the Ricky Gervais bite-the-hand-that-feeds-you thing and worked the juxtaposition rather nicely. Chicago Tribune television critic Nina Metz lauded MacFarlane for keeping "a solid handle on the proceedings." She also remarked that the host "opened with a series of jokes that were bona fide winners, landing on just the right tone: confident but not cocksure". Associated Press critic Frazier Moore extolled MacFarlane observing that he "seized the camera Sunday as host of ABC's Oscarcast and proved to its vast audience that he's a ridiculously versatile entertainer, a guy who can be as charming as he is famously irreverent, even polarizing."

Ratings and reception
The American telecast on ABC drew in an average of 40.38 million people over its length, which was a 3% increase from the previous year's ceremony. An estimated 77.92 million total viewers watched all or part of the awards. The show also drew higher Nielsen ratings compared to the two previous ceremonies with 24.47% of households watching over a 35.65 share. In addition, the program scored its highest key demo ratings in six years with a 13.71 rating over a 33.45 share among viewers in the 18–49 demographic.

In July 2013, the ceremony presentation received nine nominations for the 65th Primetime Emmys. The following month, the ceremony didn't win any of the nominations.

In Memoriam 
The annual In Memoriam segment was presented by actor/producer/director George Clooney. The montage featured an excerpt of the main title from Out of Africa by composer John Barry. At the end of the tribute, singer Barbra Streisand sang "The Way We Were" from the film of the same name in tribute to composer Marvin Hamlisch.

 Ernest Borgnine - Actor
 Eiko Ishioka - Costume designer
 Ralph McQuarrie - Conceptual designer, illustrator
 Jack Klugman - Actor
 Celeste Holm - Actress
 Adam Yauch - Musician, film executive
 Michael Clarke Duncan - Actor
 Charles Durning - Actor
 Carlo Rambaldi - Special effects artist
 Erland Josephson - Actor
 Richard Robbins - Composer
 Stephen Frankfurt - Advertising executive, title designer
 Harris Savides - Cinematographer
 Tonino Guerra - Writer
 J. Michael Riva - Production designer
 Ulu Grosbard - Director
 Herbert Lom - Actor
 Bruce Surtees - Cinematographer
 Andrew Sarris - Film critic
 George A. Bowers - Film editor
 Tony Scott - Director
 Theodore Soderberg - Sound
 Lois W. Smith - Publicist
 Geoffrey G. Ammer - Marketing executive
 Neil Travis - Film editor
 Michael Hopkins - Sound
 John D. Lowry - Image restoration pioneer
 Hal David - Songwriter
 Nora Ephron - Writer, director
 Charles Rosen - Production designer
 Jake Eberts - Executive
 Michael Kohut - Re-recording mixer, executive
 Frank Pierson - Writer, director
 Chris Marker - Director, writer
 Charles C. Washburn - Assistant director
 Ray Bradbury - Writer
 Richard Rodney Bennett - Composer
 Robert B. Sherman - Composer, songwriter
 Richard D. Zanuck - Producer
 Matthew Yuricich - Visual effects
 Marvin Hamlisch - Composer, songwriter

See also
 19th Screen Actors Guild Awards
 33rd Golden Raspberry Awards
 33rd Brit Awards
 55th Grammy Awards
 65th Primetime Emmy Awards
 66th British Academy Film Awards
 37th Laurence Olivier Awards
 67th Tony Awards
 70th Golden Globe Awards
 List of submissions to the 85th Academy Awards for Best Foreign Language Film

Notes 
A: Both Life of Pi and Silver Linings Playbook would eventually earn over $100 million in domestic ticket sales before the ceremony on February 24. Zero Dark Thirty was the number one film at the American box office during the weekend of January 11–13; the movie eventually grossed $91 million prior to the awards gala.

References

External links 

Official websites
 
 

News resources
 85th Academy Awards Boston.com
 Oscars 2013 The Guardian
 Academy Awards 2013 People

Analysis
 2012 Academy Awards Winners and History Filmsite
 Academy Awards, USA: 2013 Internet Movie Database

Other resources
 

Academy Awards ceremonies
2012 film awards
2013 in Los Angeles
2013 controversies
Mass media-related controversies in the United States
Television controversies in the United States
2013 in American cinema
2013 awards in the United States
February 2013 events in the United States
Television shows directed by Don Mischer